Sukhothai Thammathirat Open University or STOU is the only open university in Thailand.

History
Sukhothai Thammathirat Open University was officially established by royal charter on 5 September 1978 as Thailand's eleventh state university to provide the people with increased education opportunities. King Bhumibol Adulyadej (King Rama IX), bestowed the name "Sukhothai Thammathirat Open University" in the honor of King Prajadhipok (Rama VII), one of whose titles before his accession to the throne was "Prince Sukhothai Thammaracha" or "Prince of Sukhothai". It was the first open university in Southeast Asia to use a distance teaching/learning system.

STOU received its first academic class on 1 December 1980, beginning with three schools of study: educational studies, liberal arts, and management science. From 1979 to 1984, STOU shared space with other state agencies and universities. In 1981, the university acquired its current property in Pak Kret District of Nonthaburi Province, and began operating from the new location on 9 December 1984. Today the university has 12 schools of study with undergraduate, graduate, and certificate programs.

Curriculum 
 School of Law
 School of Communication Arts
 School of Human Ecology
 School of Political Science
 School of Management Science
 School of Health Sciences
 School of Liberal Arts
 School of Education
 School of Economics
 School of Agriculture and Cooperatives
 School of Science and technology
 School of Nursing

References

External links 

Sukhothai Thammathirat Open University (English site)

Universities in Thailand
Buildings and structures in Nonthaburi province
Distance education institutions based in Thailand
Educational institutions established in 1978
1978 establishments in Thailand